John Hopwood Mickey (September 30, 1845 – June 2, 1910) was an American banker and Republican politician who served as the 13th Governor of Nebraska from 1903 to 1907.

Life and career

Early life and ancestors
He was born near Burlington, Des Moines County, Iowa, on September 30, 1845, a son of Oliver Perry Mickey, a pioneer in Iowa, locating there from Pennsylvania in 1836 and Betsy Ann Davidson.

Education
In 1847, his parents moved the family removed to  Louisa County, Iowa, and it was there his education was attained in the Iowa public school system. After being mustered out of the service, he returned to his Iowa home and for two years was a student at Iowa Wesleyan College in Mount Pleasant, Iowa. Upon leaving college, he engaged in school teaching and during the vacation periods he devoted himself to farming.

Military service
In 1863, he enlisted as a private in the Union Army, in Company D, 8th Iowa cavalry, and served until the close of the war. His regiment was in service in eastern Tennessee and with William Tecumseh Sherman in his Atlanta Campaign until the successful surrender of Atlanta on September 2, 1864. He also served in the Franklin-Nashville Campaign. He was honorably mustered out of service in August 1865.

Marriage and family
He married as his first wife, on September 10, 1867, at Des Moines, Polk County, Iowa, Morinda McCray, born April 8, 1849, at Fayette, Indiana, the daughter of James McCray and Mary Harlan.  She died on December 23, 1886, at Osceola, Polk County, Nebraska and is buried in Osceola Cemetery.  John and Morinda were the parents of 5 children.

He married, as his second wife, on December 8, 1887, at the Methodist Episcopal Church in Osceola, Polk County, Nebraska, Flora Cinderella Campbell, the daughter of Benjamin Crawford Campbell and Elizabeth Ann Scott. She was born on November 16, 1861, in Iowa and died on January 16, 1938, at Osceola, Nebraska. She is buried next to her husband in Osceola Cemetery. John and Flora were the parents of 4 children.

Career
He moved with his young bride and child to Polk County, Nebraska, arrived on September 3, 1868, and homesteaded. He moved to the town of Osceola in 1872.

In May 1879, the Osceola Bank, with a capital stock of $5,000 was opened by Mr. Mickey. Ever since its organization Mr. Mickey has been its president. During the financial stringency of 1893, when financial institutions throughout the country were threatened with disaster, Mr. Mickey's bank survived the storm and was the means of assisting many of the business houses and farmers of Polk county in maintaining such credit as enabled them to survive during the depressed times.

Political career
Even though his father was a Stephen A. Douglas Democrat, he always identified as a Republican. He cast his first vote for Abraham Lincoln in 1864, when he was only nineteen years old, the State of Iowa having passed a special act enabling all soldiers to vote irrespective of age.

Shortly after settling in Nebraska, Mickey was elected treasurer of Polk County. After 10 years as treasurer, he served two terms in the Nebraska House of Representatives. He was elected governor of Nebraska in 1902 and re-elected in 1904. His failed attempt to arbitrate strikes in Omaha between Gurdon Wattles's Omaha Traction Company and union organizers in 1903 marked the rest of his administration.

During his tenure as governor, numerous pardons were granted; an improved state auditing system was initiated; and a direct primary law was promoted.

Post career
After retiring as governor, John Mickey returned to Osceola, Nebraska.
He was an active member of the Osceola Methodist Episcopal Church, and for many years was a trustee of his church and superintendent of the Sunday school. He was a lifelong supporter of the Temperance movement, and served as president of the Board of Trustees of Nebraska Wesleyan University.

Death
He died at his home in Osceola on June 2, 1910, and was buried in the Osceola Cemetery.

References

 

1845 births
1910 deaths
Republican Party governors of Nebraska
Iowa Wesleyan University alumni
Politicians from Burlington, Iowa
People from Louisa County, Iowa
People of Iowa in the American Civil War
Republican Party members of the Nebraska House of Representatives
19th-century American politicians
People from Osceola, Nebraska